The 1990 Labatt Brier, the Canadian men's curling championship, was held from March 4 to 11 in Sault Ste. Marie, Ontario.

Ed Werenich of Ontario defeated Jim Sullivan of New Brunswick to win his second Brier. 

The runner-up finish by New Brunswick was their best Brier finish since the inaugural Brier back in 1927 where they also finished runner-up.

Teams

Round robin standings

Round robin results

Draw 1

Draw 2

Draw 3

Draw 4

Draw 5

Draw 6

Draw 7

Draw 8

Draw 9

Draw 10

Draw 11

Draw 12

Draw 13

Draw 14

Draw 15

Tiebreaker

Playoffs

Semifinal

Final

Statistics

Top 5 player percentages
Round Robin only

Team percentages
Round Robin only

References

Sport in Sault Ste. Marie, Ontario
1990
1990 in Canadian curling
Curling in Northern Ontario
1990 in Ontario
March 1990 sports events in Canada